Nestor Primecare Services Limited also known as Allied Healthcare was the UK's largest domiciliary care business and a leading provider of outsourced healthcare services to the English primary care sector. In 2018 Nestor Primecare Service went into Creditors' Voluntary Liquidation ("CVL")  and liquidators appointed. They immediately  sold the whole of the business and assets of Allied Health-Services Limited and Allied Health Support Limited, to Health Care Resourcing Group Limited (CRG).

History
Allied Healthcare started in 1972, with a nursing home in Staffordshire. It now has 140 branches across the UK and Ireland.

Allied Healthcare was acquired by Saga group  in 2011. 

In December 2015, Saga agreed to sell Allied Healthcare to Aurelius Group, which describes themselves as  a pan-European asset manager with offices in Munich, London, Stockholm, and Madrid.

Nestor Primecare Services Ltd., registered in Stafford, is the legal entity behind the Allied Healthcare brand.  It also provides Out-of-hours services.

On 21 April 2018, Allied Healthcare announced it would seek a Company Voluntary Arrangement to protect itself from creditors due to a "highly challenging environment", through it would continue to operate without redundancies.   In November 2018 the Care Quality Commission issued a notice saying it had serious doubts about the future of the business and warned local authorities that they might have to intervene.  The company said this was "premature and unwarranted" as they had secured further funding support. It subsequently announced it was exploring the sale or transition of services to alternative providers, including the transfer of staff.  In December 2018 it was acquired by CRG a specialist healthcare recruitment agency, part of the Health Care Resourcing Group, based in Prescot. CRG took over all the existing care contracts, and they will continue under the Allied Healthcare brand.

It terminated its contract for the out-of-hours service in Birmingham in November 2018. The service was taken over by the Badger GP-run out-of-hours and urgent care cooperative.

Legal action
In October 2014 Allied Healthcare, then owned by Saga, was ordered to pay the legal costs of Elaine Fernandez, a nurse who was awarded more than £80,000 by an employment tribunal in 2013. It ruled she was unfairly dismissed and suffered detriment for making protected whistleblowing disclosures. The tribunal said the company had pursued a "defensive position" that was "unreasonably hostile".  She had raised concerns after Hywel Dda Health Board which commissioned the company to provide nursing care for a disabled patient decided to replace nurses with healthcare assistants.

See also
Private medicine in the United Kingdom

Notes

References

External links
Official website
Badger Group GP Out of Hours Services
Health care companies of the United Kingdom
Private providers of NHS services
Primary care